Prince Semyon Semyonovich Abamelek-Lazarev (also Abamelik-Lazaryan; Russian: Семён Семёнович Абамелек-Лазарев; 24 November 1857 in Moscow – 2 October 1916 in Kislovodsk) was a Russian millionaire of Armenian origin noted for his contributions to archaeology and geology.

His father Prince Simeon Abamelik was a Major General of the Russian army and an amateur painter. He married his first cousin Elizaveta Lazareva, the last of her family and the heiress to an enormous fortune. She was the granddaughter of Manuc Bei and the grand-niece of Count Ivan Lazarev (a court banker to Catherine the Great). Prince Semyon inherited her steel mills in the Urals, her surname and the right to manage the Lazarev Institute of Oriental Languages.

After attending the Saint-Petersburg University, Abamelik-Lazarev joined Vasily Polenov and Adrian Prakhov in their 1881 tour across the Middle East. He took part in excavating the site of Palmyra and discovered the so-called "Palmyrene tariff" — a large slab with an inscription in Greek and Aramaic listing ancient customs rules. He also financed the excavations at Jerash. A patron and member of the Russian Geographical Society, he published two lavishly decorated volumes about Palmyra (1884) and Jerash (1897).

In 1897, Prince Abamelik married Princess Moina (Maria) Demidova (1877 — 1955), a daughter of the 2nd Prince of San Donato. Soon they bought a villa on the Janiculum which has been known since then as Villa Abamelek. Semyon died suddenly in 1916 and was buried in the Lazarev family sepulchre at the Smolensky Cemetery in St Petersburg.

Prince Abamelek is also remembered as a patron of aviation. In 1912, he established the Romanov Cup for the first aviator who would fly from Saint Petersburg to Moscow and back within 24 hours. The Abamelek Cup was awarded in 1913 for the first flight from Odessa to Saint Petersburg.

His widow continued to live at the Villa di Pratolino near Florence until her death in 1955. The Villa Abamelek was given by the Italian government to the Soviet embassy in 1948. It serves as the official residence of the Russian ambassador to Italy.

References

External links

Armenian people from the Russian Empire
Heads of schools in the Russian Empire
Archaeologists from the Russian Empire
1857 births
1916 deaths
Semyon Semyonovich
Privy Councillor (Russian Empire)
Businesspeople from the Russian Empire
Aviation history of Russia